Dansville is a village in the town of North Dansville, with a small northern part in the town of Sparta in Livingston County, in western New York, United States. As of the 2020 census, the village population was 4,433. The village is named after Daniel Faulkner, an early European-American settler. Interstate 390 passes the west side of the village.

History 
Daniel Faulkner founded the village in 1795. This was land ceded by the Iroquois tribes to the United States after the Revolutionary War, as four of the tribes had been allies of the defeated British forces. When Livingston County was created, the village was included in the town of Sparta. Dansville became an incorporated village in 1845.

A spa was opened in 1854, eventually attracted many prominent people to Dansville for the water cure. After a quick series of unsuccessful owners, it was purchased in September 1858 by new owners who recruited James Caleb Jackson as the physician-in-charge. He was assisted by his wife, known as "Mother Jackson", and their adopted daughter, Dr. Harriet Newell Austin. A Jackson family operation for many years, the family referred to it as the Jackson Sanatorium by 1890. 

The Delaware, Lackawanna and Western Railroad opened its mainline between Binghamton and Buffalo on a route high above Dansville, on September 17, 1882. The famous "Dansville Hill" was a serious and costly impediment to heavy eastbound freight trains for 81 years, until the mainline was abandoned by the Erie Lackawanna Railroad between Groveland and Wayland in late 1963. The EL wisely rerouted all mainline traffic over the former Erie mainline via Hornell, which had much easier grades. A portion of the right-of-way is now used as an access road to a cellphone tower, which has views looking westward down to Dansville and its surrounding area.

The Dansville Downtown Historic District, Dansville Library, Engleside, English Evangelical Lutheran Church, Elias H. Geiger House, William Hartman Farmstead, Pioneer Farm, and post office are all significant areas and structures listed on the National Register of Historic Places.

Notable people 

Harriet N. Austin, physician and dress reform advocate; grew up in Dansville
Clara Barton, resided in Dansville, where she established the first American Red Cross chapter in 1881.
Edward T. Fairchild, Wisconsin jurist; raised in Dansville
Millard Fillmore, 13th president of the United States; resided in the village for several months
Job E. Hedges, Republican nominee for governor of New York in 1912
Dennis Walter Hickey, Auxiliary Bishop of Rochester, New York
James Caleb Jackson, created Granula, the world's first breakfast cereal
Andrew J. Lorish, Union Army soldier and Medal of Honor recipient; born in Dansville in 1832
Nathaniel Rochester, founder of Rochester, New York.
John Sullivan, Major League Baseball catcher and coach

Geography
The village sits in a glacially formed valley, common throughout western New York. Canaseraga Creek flows northward just west of the village limits; it is a tributary of the Genesee River.

Interstate 390, New York State Route 36, New York State Route 63, New York State Route 256, and  New York State Route 436 pass through the village. It is bordered to the northwest by the unincorporated community of Cumminsville.

Demographics

As of the census of 2000, there were 4,832 people, 1,976 households, and 1,246 families residing in the village. The population density was 2,042.4 people per square mile (787.2/km2). There were 2,090 housing units at an average density of 883.4 per square mile (340.5/km2). The racial makeup of the village was 95.78% White, 1.26% African American, 0.23% Native American, 0.66% Asian, 1.30% from other races, and 0.77% from two or more races. Hispanic or Latino of any race were 2.07% of the population.

There were 1,912 households, out of which 34.0% had children under the age of 18 living with them, 46.7% were married couples living together, 14.2% had a female householder with no husband present, and 34.8% were non-families. 28.6% of all households were made up of individuals, and 14.0% had someone living alone who was 65 years of age or older. The average household size was 2.49 and the average family size was 3.03.

In the village, the population was spread out, with 26.7% under the age of 18, 8.7% from 18 to 24, 27.5% from 25 to 44, 21.3% from 45 to 64, and 15.7% who were 65 years of age or older. The median age was 37 years. For every 100 females, there were 90.1 males. For every 100 females age 18 and over, there were 86.2 males.

The median income for a household in the village was $32,903, and the median income for a family was $41,519. Males had a median income of $31,699 versus $25,256 for females. The per capita income for the village was $15,994. About 12.3% of families and 17.0% of the population were below the poverty line, including 17.3% of those under age 18 and 11.7% of those age 65 or over.

Infrastructure 

Dansville Municipal Airport (DSV) is a general aviation airport located north of the village. The airport was opened in 1927, primarily by the efforts of World War I aviator Lynn Pickard. The New York State Festival of Balloons is held at the airport in early September.

A branch of Genesee Community College is located in Dansville.

Nicholas H. Noyes Memorial Hospital, a 72-bed acute care hospital, is located on the southern edge of the village on Route 36 adjacent to Exit 4 on Interstate 390. It provides health services to residents of Livingston, Allegany, Steuben and surrounding counties.

Culture
Castle on the Hill is a former water cure facility that resembles a castle overlooking Dansville from the hillside. Founded in 1858 by Dr. James Caleb Jackson as the "Our Home on the Hillside", the original building burned in 1882. The present building opened in 1883. It has changed hands several times, becoming a physical fitness hotel (the Physical Culture Hotel) where the rich and famous came from New York City and other areas to "get away from it all". The building now stands vacant.

A grant from New York State for $2.5 million was approved in January 2008 to renovate the former "Jackson Health Resort".

References

External links 

 Village of Dansville official website
  Dansville Public Library
 New York State Festival of Balloons
 "The Castle on the Hill": history, present-day photos, and video of the Jackson Sanatorium
 History of the Castle on the Hill
 Physical Culture Hotel brochure

Villages in New York (state)
Rochester metropolitan area, New York
Populated places established in 1795
Villages in Livingston County, New York
1795 establishments in New York (state)